Tezepelumab, sold under the brand name Tezspire, is a human monoclonal antibody used for the treatment of asthma. Tezepelumab blocks thymic stromal lymphopoietin (TSLP), an epithelial cytokine that has been suggested to be critical in the initiation and persistence of airway inflammation.

The most common side effects include arthralgia (joint pain) and pharyngitis (sore throat).

Tezepelumab was approved for medical use in the United States in December 2021, and in the European Union in September 2022. The U.S. Food and Drug Administration considers it to be a first-in-class medication.

Medical uses 
Tezepelumab is indicated for the add-on maintenance treatment of people aged twelve years and older with severe asthma.

History 
Two main studies including over 1,500 adults and adolescents with inadequately controlled asthma showed that tezepelumab was effective in reducing the number of severe asthma flare‑ups.

Society and culture

Legal status 
On 21 July 2022, the Committee for Medicinal Products for Human Use (CHMP) of the European Medicines Agency (EMA) adopted a positive opinion, recommending the granting of a marketing authorization for the medicinal product Tezspire, intended as add-on treatment in adult and adolescent patients with severe asthma. The applicant for this medicinal product is AstraZeneca AB. Tezepelumab was approved for medical use in the European Union in September 2022.

Research 
It is being studied for the treatment of chronic obstructive pulmonary disease, chronic rhinosinusitis with nasal polyps, chronic spontaneous urticaria and eosinophilic esophagitis (EoE).

In phase III trials, tezepelumab demonstrated efficacy compared to placebo for patients with severe, uncontrolled asthma.

Structural studies by X-ray crystallography showed that tezepelumab competes against a critical part of the TSLPR binding site on TSLP.

References

External links 
 
 
 

Amgen
AstraZeneca brands
Breakthrough therapy
Monoclonal antibodies
Orphan drugs
Antiasthmatic drugs